Bugok-dong may refer to 

Bugok-dong, Busan
Bugok-dong, Ansan
Bugok-dong, Uiwang
Bugok-dong, Gunpo